Rainer Bonhof (born 29 March 1952) is a German former professional footballer, who played as a defensive midfielder or wing-back. He was known for his occasional bursts upfield and his fierce shot. He was a key player for the 1974 West Germany national team that won the World Cup (defeating the Netherlands 2–1 in the final, where he provided the assist to the winning goal). Bonhof was one of the stars for his club side, Borussia Mönchengladbach and won numerous domestic league and cup titles.

Playing career
Bonhof was born in Emmerich am Rhein, North Rhine-Westphalia. He was part of the highly successful Borussia Mönchengladbach side of the 1970s, winning numerous Bundesliga, DFB-Pokal, and UEFA Cup titles. He was widely recognized for having one of the game's hardest free-kicks as well as long and precise throw-ins. He scored 14 goals in European cup competitions and amassed 57 goals in the West German top-flight.  Bonhof was awarded the ARD Goal of the Month on three occasions, twice for free-kicks and once for a 30-metre strike.

He won his first of 53 caps in 1972. Bonhof became (at that time) Germany's youngest World Champion on 7 July 1974 following his team's 2–1 win over the Netherlands in Munich's Olympiastadion at the 1974 FIFA World Cup. His penetrating run into the opposition penalty area and pass to Gerd Muller led to the winning goal in that game. Two matches earlier Bonhof scored the goal that put West Germany up 2–1 against Sweden, a match the Germans eventually won 4–2, which clinched their place in the semi-finals. Bonhof was a fixture in the West German national team from the World Cup onward. He was one of the best players in the 1976 European Championship, assisting on four of the six West German goals in the semi-final and final (West Germany lost to Czechoslovakia on penalties in the final).

Bonhof played in every match of the 1978 FIFA World Cup when West Germany was eliminated in the second round following a 3–2 defeat at the hands of their historic rivals, Austria. He continued to play an important role in the national team following his transfer to Valencia. His move and that of Uli Stielike prompted the DFB to remove their ban on selecting foreign based players for the national team. He played a role in qualifying for the 1980 European Championships and was selected for the squad, but injuries kept him from making an appearance during the West German victory. His last appearance for the national team came in a 4–1 defeat at the hands of Brazil, and in spite of a strong Bundesliga campaign for 1. FC Köln in 1981–82 he was not selected to return to the national team.

From 1980 to 2012 Bonhof was the only player to win the European Championships twice, although he did not play a single game in either the 1972 or 1980 finals. He now shares the record with 12 players from the Spain national team which won back-to-back titles in 2008 and 2012. Bonhof remains the most decorated player in the history of the European Championships, with two gold medals and one silver.

Former Liverpool goalkeeper, Ray Clemence, in 1977 following a European Cup final between the Reds and Borussia Mönchengladbach, admitted he feared Bonhof's shots. The fear was proved justified, as during the spring of 1978 Clemence was beaten twice by Bonhof from nearly identical locations, at the club and international level. A Bonhof shot had beat Clemence in the 1977 final too, but that strike hit the post.

Bonhof's playing career was abruptly ended by an ankle injury in 1983.

Post-playing career
Bonhof went on to coach. He received his formal license in 1988, and has coached several teams. Bonhof was coach of Borussia Moenchengladbach in the late 1990s, but the team was relegated from the Bundesliga. He was appointed manager of the Scotland under-21 team in 2002, joining the Scotland national team setup some months after countryman Berti Vogts had been appointed Scotland manager. Bonhof was the first full-time manager of the Scotland under-21 team. The team enjoyed initial success under Bonhof, winning an away qualifier against Germany and progressing to the qualifying playoffs for the 2004 European Championship. Scotland lost in the playoffs on aggregate to Croatia. Bonhof continued as Scotland under-21 manager after Vogts resigned as national team manager in November 2004, but resigned in November 2005 after the team went on a run of 14 games without a victory. Bonhof had helped Darren Fletcher and James McFadden progress to the full national team.

On 1 September 2006, Bonhof signed a contract with recent FA Premier League winners Chelsea to become their scout for the scopes of Germany and Austria. The contract was a rolling deal, allowing either Chelsea and Bonhof to break it up any time. The deal between Chelsea F.C. and Bonhof ended because of the club's high debts. Bonhof left London on 31 October 2008.

On 11 February 2009, he was named as the new vice president of Borussia Mönchengladbach.

Honours
Borussia Mönchengladbach
Bundesliga: 1970–71, 1974–75, 1975–76, 1976–77
DFB-Pokal: 1972–73
UEFA Cup: 1974–75

Valencia
Copa del Rey: 1978–79
UEFA Cup Winners Cup: 1979–80

1. FC Köln
DFB-Pokal: 1982–83

Germany
FIFA World Cup: 1974
UEFA European Championship: 1972, 1980
UEFA European Championship: Runner-up: 1976

Individual
kicker Bundesliga Team of the Season: 1973–74, 1976–77, 1977–78
UEFA European Championship Team of the Tournament: 1976
Goal of the Year (Germany): 1978

References

External links
 
 
 
 

1952 births
Living people
People from Emmerich am Rhein
Sportspeople from Düsseldorf (region)
German footballers
Footballers from North Rhine-Westphalia
Association football midfielders
Germany international footballers
Germany under-21 international footballers
UEFA Cup winning players
FIFA World Cup-winning players
UEFA European Championship-winning players
UEFA Euro 1972 players
1974 FIFA World Cup players
UEFA Euro 1976 players
1978 FIFA World Cup players
UEFA Euro 1980 players
Bundesliga players
La Liga players
Borussia Mönchengladbach players
1. FC Köln players
Hertha BSC players
Valencia CF players
German football managers
Bundesliga managers
Kuwait Premier League managers
Borussia Mönchengladbach managers
Kuwait SC managers
Scotland national under-21 football team managers
West German expatriate footballers
West German expatriate sportspeople in Spain
Expatriate footballers in Spain
German expatriate sportspeople in Scotland
Expatriate football managers in Scotland
German expatriate sportspeople in Kuwait
Expatriate football managers in Kuwait
West German footballers